Theresia Reiniera van der Pant  (27 November 1924, Schiedam – 4 February 2013, Amsterdam) was a Dutch sculptor. Examples of her work include the Equestrian statue of Queen Wilhelmina, which stands on Rokin street in Amsterdam.

References

1924 births
2013 deaths
Dutch sculptors
People from Schiedam